Richard Whalley (c. 1558 – c. 1632), of Kirton and Screveton, Nottinghamshire, was an English politician.

He was a Member (MP) of the Parliament of England for Nottinghamshire in 1597 and for Boroughbridge in 1601. He married Frances, sister of Joan Barrington, who was an aunt of Oliver Cromwell.

References

1550s births
1632 deaths
English MPs 1597–1598
English MPs 1601
People from Newark and Sherwood (district)
People from Rushcliffe (district)